Sirabhorn Sobhon (19 July 1888 – 24 May 1898), was a Princess of Siam (later Thailand). She was a member of the Siamese Royal Family. She was a daughter of Chulalongkorn, King Rama V of Siam.

Her mother was Queen Savang Vadhana, queen consort and half-sister of King Chulalongkorn (later become Queen Sri Savarindira, the Queen Grandmother). She was the 57th daughter of King Chulalongkorn, and the 6th child of Queen Savang Vadhana. She was given the full name from her father as Sirabhorn Sobhon Bimolratanavadi

She died in her childhood from pneumonia on 24 May 1898, at the age of 9.

Ancestry

1888 births
1898 deaths
19th-century Thai royalty who died as children
19th-century Chakri dynasty
Thai female Chao Fa
Deaths from pneumonia in Thailand
Children of Chulalongkorn
Daughters of kings